ONE Friday Fights 5: Kongklai vs. Superball (also known as ONE Lumpinee 5) was a combat sport event produced by ONE Championship that took place on February 17, 2023, at Lumpinee Boxing Stadium in Bangkok, Thailand.

Background
The first six bout card live on FanDuel TV, was headlined by a 154 pounds catchweight muay thai bout between Revo Sor.Sommai vs. Furkan Karabağ. The second six bout card live on YouTube and Facebook: ONE Championship, headlined by a 138 pounds catchweight muay thai bout between Kongklai AnnyMuayThai vs. Superball Tded99.

Results

Bonus awards 
The following fighters received $10,000 bonuses.

Performance of the Night: Superball Tded99, Kongklai AnnyMuayThai, Namphongnoi Sor.Sommai, Teeyai P.K.Saenchai, Khunsuk Sor.Dechapan and Furkan Karabağ

See also 

 2023 in ONE Championship
 List of ONE Championship events
 List of current ONE fighters

References 

Events in Bangkok
ONE Championship events
2023 in mixed martial arts
Mixed martial arts in Thailand
Sports competitions in Thailand
February 2023 sports events in Thailand